A ziggurat is a pyramidal structure that first appeared during ancient times in the Middle East. It may also refer to:

 A ziggurat algorithm, a number generating algorithm
 The Ziggurat, the Chet Holifield Federal Building in Laguna Niguel, California
 The Ziggurat, an office building in West Sacramento, California
 Ziggurats (album), a 2007 album by The Beautiful Girls
 Zigurat (company), a Spanish video game development company
 Ziggurat (video game), a 2012 iOS video game by Action Button Entertainment
 Ziggurat (2014 video game), a 2014 video game by Milkstone Studios released on PC, Xbox One and PS4
 Ziggurat Pyramid, Dubai, a pyramid-shaped arcology that was conceived for Dubai
 Norfolk Terrace and Suffolk Terrace - halls of residence at the University of East Anglia